Neospastis is a genus of moths of the family Xyloryctidae.

Species
 Neospastis calpidias Meyrick, 1917
 Neospastis encryphias (Meyrick, 1907)
 Neospastis ichnaea (Meyrick, 1914)
 Neospastis sinensis Bradley, 1961

References

 
Xyloryctidae
Xyloryctidae genera